, also known as Shinmen Takezō, Miyamoto Bennosuke or, by his Buddhist name, Niten Dōraku, was a Japanese swordsman, philosopher, strategist, writer and rōnin, who became renowned through stories of his unique double-bladed swordsmanship and undefeated record in his 61 duels (next is 33 by Itō Ittōsai). Musashi, as he was often simply known, is considered a Kensei, a sword-saint of Japan. He was the founder of the Niten Ichi-ryū, or Nito Ichi-ryū, style of swordsmanship, and in his final years authored  and Dokkōdō (獨行道, The Path of Aloneness). 

Both documents were given to Terao Magonojō, the most important of Musashi's students, seven days before Musashi's death. The Book of Five Rings deals primarily with the character of his Niten Ichi-ryū school in a concrete sense, i.e., his own practical martial art and its generic significance; The Path of Aloneness, on the other hand, deals with the ideas that lie behind it, as well as his life's philosophy in a few short aphoristic sentences.

The Miyamoto Musashi Budokan training center, located in Ōhara-chō (Mimasaka), Okayama prefecture, Japan was erected to honor his name and legend.

Biography

Birth

The details of Miyamoto Musashi's early life are difficult to verify. Musashi himself simply states in The Book of Five Rings that he was born in Harima Province. Niten Ki (an early biography of Musashi) supports the assertion that Musashi was born in 1584: "[He] was born in Banshū, in Tenshō 12 [1584], the Year of the Monkey." The historian Kamiko Tadashi, commenting on Musashi's text, notes: "Munisai was Musashi's father ... he lived in Miyamoto village, in the Yoshino district [of Mimasaka Province]. Musashi was most probably born here."

Musashi gives his full name and title in The Book of Five Rings as Shinmen Musashi-no-Kami Fujiwara no Harunobu (新免武蔵守藤原玄信). His father, Shinmen Munisai (新免無二斎) was an accomplished martial artist and master of the sword and jutte (also jitte). Munisai, in turn, was the son of Hirata Shōgen (平田将監), a vassal of Shinmen Iga no Kami, the lord of Takayama Castle in the Yoshino district of Mimasaka Province. Hirata was relied upon by Lord Shinmen and so was allowed to use the Shinmen name. As for "Musashi", Musashi no Kami was a court title, making him the nominal governor of Musashi Province. "Fujiwara" was the lineage from which Musashi claimed descent.

Upbringing
Musashi's eczema developed in his infancy, and this adversely affected his appearance. Another story claims that he never took a bath because he did not want to be surprised unarmed.

First duel
According to the introduction of The Book of Five Rings, Musashi states that his first successful duel was at the age of 13, against a samurai named Arima Kihei who fought using the Kashima Shintō-ryū style, founded by Tsukahara Bokuden (b. 1489, d. 1571). The main source of the duel is the Hyoho senshi denki ("Anecdotes about the Deceased Master"). Summarized, its account goes as follows:

Travels and duels
In 1599, Musashi left his village, apparently at the age of 15 (according to the Tosakushi, "The Registry of the Sakushu Region", although the Tanji Hokin Hikki says he was 16 years old in 1599, which agrees time-wise with the age reported in Musashi's first duel). His family possessions such as furniture, weapons, genealogy, and other records were left with his sister and her husband, Hirao Yoemon. He spent his time traveling and engaging in duels.

Duel with Sasaki Kojirō

In 1611, Musashi began practicing zazen at the Myōshin-ji temple, where he met Nagaoka Sado, vassal to Hosokawa Tadaoki; Tadaoki was a powerful lord who had received the Kumamoto Domain in west-central Kyūshū after the Battle of Sekigahara. Munisai had moved to northern Kyūshū and became Tadaoki's teacher, leading to the possibility that Munisai introduced Musashi to Sasaki Kojirō, another guest of the Hosokawa clan at the time.  Somehow, a duel was proposed between the two; in some versions, Nagaoka proposed the duel, in others, Kojirō proposed it out of rivalry or jealously.  Tokitsu believes that the duel was politically motivated, as a matter of consolidating Tadaoki's control over his fief.

The duel was scheduled for April 13, 1612, when Musashi was approximately 30 years old. The departure by boat for the duel was arranged for the Hour of the Dragon in the early morning (approximately 8:00 AM) to the island of Ganryūjima, a small isle between Honshū and Kyūshū.  While Hosokawa officials banned spectators, the island was filled with them anyway. Kojirō was known for wielding an oversized nodachi (Japanese greatsword) called a "laundry-drying pole" for its length, as well as being titled "three-shaku silver blade" (「三尺の白刃」).  Using this sword, Kojirō was said to be known for a swift two-stroke sword technique called tsubame gaeshi (not to confuse with the judo move of the same name, which received the name as a homage), and he bore the nickname "The Demon of the Western Provinces".  Kojirō arrived at the appointed time, but was then left to wait for hours; Musashi had overslept. Kojirō sent out servants to retrieve Musashi, who ate a full breakfast, taking his time. In some variants of the tale, Musashi intentionally arrives late as a sign of disrespect. As he sailed over the Kanmon Straits, Musashi carved a crude oversized bokken from one of the ship's oars with his knife, making an improvised wooden sword, possibly to help wake himself up.  Upon his arrival, an irritated Kojirō chided Musashi's lateness and dramatically threw his scabbard into the sea, as a sign that he would not stop and would fight to the death.  Musashi responded with a taunt of his own, saying that Kojirō clearly wasn't confident in himself if he thought he'd never get a chance to use a fine scabbard again.

The two circled each other, and Kojirō leaped toward Musashi with his trademark overhead strike. Musashi, too, jumped and swung his weapon with a shout, and the two sword strokes met.  Musashi's headband fell off, sliced by Kojirō's sword, but somehow, only the headband was cut rather than Musashi's skull.  Musashi's strike, meanwhile, had struck true, cleaving Kojirō's skull.

Later life 
Twenty-one years later, in 1633, Musashi began staying with Hosokawa Tadatoshi, daimyō of Kumamoto Castle, who had moved to the Kumamoto fief and Kokura, to train and paint. While he engaged in very few duels; one would occur in 1634 at the arrangement of Lord Ogasawara, in which Musashi defeated a lance specialist by the name of Takada Matabei. Musashi would officially become the retainer of the Hosokowa lords of Kumamoto in 1640. The Niten Ki records "[he] received from Lord Tadatoshi: 17 retainers, a stipend of 300 koku, the rank of ōkumigashira 大組頭, and Chiba Castle in Kumamoto as his residence."

In the second month of 1641, Musashi wrote a work called the Hyoho Sanju Go ("Thirty-five Instructions on Strategy") for Hosokawa Tadatoshi, this work overlapped and formed the basis for the later The Book of Five Rings. This was the year that his adopted son, Hirao Yoemon, became Master of Arms for the Owari fief. In 1642, Musashi suffered attacks of neuralgia, foreshadowing his future ill-health. In 1643 he retired to a cave named Reigandō as a hermit to write The Book of Five Rings. He finished it in the second month of 1645. On the twelfth of the fifth month, sensing his impending death, Musashi bequeathed his worldly possessions, after giving his manuscript copy of The Book of Five Rings to the younger brother of Terao Magonojo, his closest disciple. He died in Reigandō cave around June 13, 1645 (Shōhō 2, 19th day of the 5th month). The Hyoho senshi denki described his passing:

Miyamoto Musashi died of what is believed to be thoracic cancer. He died peacefully after finishing the text Dokkōdō ("The Way of Walking Alone", or "The Way of Self-Reliance"), 21 precepts on self-discipline to guide future generations.

Relationships
Writings on Musashi's life rarely mention his relationship with women, and often when they do Musashi is regularly depicted as rejecting sexual advances in favor of focusing on his swordsmanship. Alternative interpretations have taken his lack of interest as an indication of homosexuality. In contrast many legends do feature Musashi in trysts with women, some of these also reflect the view that he would eventually choose to forego physical or emotional investments to attain further insight into his work. This predominant cultural view of Musashi is somewhat contradicted by old texts such as Dobo goen (1720) which relay his intimacy with the courtesan Kumoi during his middle age. The Bushu Denraiki also details Musashi fathering a daughter by a courtesan. It is uncertain if this courtesan and Kumoi were the same person. A rumor also connected Musashi with the oiran .

Teachings
Musashi created and refined a two-sword kenjutsu technique called niten'ichi (二天一, "two heavens as one") or nitōichi (二刀一, "two swords as one") or 'Niten Ichi-ryū' (A Kongen Buddhist Sutra refers to the two heavens as the two guardians of Buddha). In this technique, the swordsman uses both a large sword, and a "companion sword" at the same time, i.e. a katana with a wakizashi.

The two-handed movements of temple drummers may have inspired him, although it could be that the technique was forged through Musashi's combat experience. Jutte techniques were taught to him by his father—the jutte was often used in battle paired with a sword; the jutte would parry and neutralize the weapon of the enemy while the sword struck or the practitioner grappled with the enemy. Today Musashi's style of swordsmanship is known as Hyōhō Niten Ichi-ryū.

Musashi was also an expert in throwing weapons. He frequently threw his short sword, and Kenji Tokitsu believes that shuriken methods for the wakizashi were the Niten Ichi Ryu's secret techniques.

Musashi spent many years studying Buddhism and swordsmanship. He was an accomplished artist, sculptor, and calligrapher. Records also show that he had architectural skills. Also, he seems to have had a rather straightforward approach to combat, with no additional frills or aesthetic considerations. This was probably due to his real-life combat experience; although in his later life, Musashi followed a more artistic approach. He made various Zen brush paintings, calligraphy, and sculpted wood and metal. Even in The Book of Five Rings he emphasizes that samurai should understand other professions as well.  Musashi's writings were very ambiguous, and translating them into English makes them even more so; thus many different translations of The Book of Five Rings can be found.

Timeline
The following timeline follows, in chronological order (of which is based on the most accurate and most widely accepted information), the life of Miyamoto Musashi.

{| class="wikitable"
|- style="background:#efefef;"
! Date
! Age
! Occurrence
|-
| 1578
|−6

| Musashi's brother, Shirota, is born.
|-
| 1584
| 0
| Miyamoto Musashi is born.
|-
| 1591
| 6–7
| Musashi is taken and raised by his uncle as a Buddhist.
|-
| 1596
| 11–12
| Musashi duels with Arima Kihei in Hirafuku, Hyōgo Prefecture.
|-
| 1599
| 14–15
| Duels with a man named Tadashima Akiyama in the northern part of Hyōgo Prefecture.
|-
| 1600
| 16
| Believed to have fought in the Battle of Sekigahara (October 21) as part of the western army. Whether he actually participated in the battle is currently in doubt.
|-
| 1604
| 19–20
| Musashi has three matches with the Yoshioka clan in Kyoto. (1) Match with Yoshioka Seijuro in Yamashiro Province, outside the city at Rendai Moor (west of Mt. Funaoka, Kita-ku, Kyoto). (2) Match with Yoshioka Denshichiro outside the city. (3) Match with Yoshioka Matashichiro outside the city at the pine of Ichijō-ji.
|-
| 
| 
| Visits Kōfuku-ji, Nara and ends up dueling with Okuzōin Dōei, the Buddhist priest trained in the style of Hōzōin-ryū.
|-
| 1605–1612
| 20–28
| Begins to travel again.
|-
| 1607
| 22–23
| Munisai (Musashi's father) passes his teachings onto Musashi.
|-
| 
| 
| Duels with the kusarigama expert Shishido (swordsman) in the western part of Mie Prefecture.
|-
| 1608
| 23–24
| Duels Musō Gonnosuke, master of the five-foot staff in Edo.
|-
| 1610
| 25–26
| Fights Hayashi Osedo and Tsujikaze Tenma in Edo.
|-
| 1611
| 26–27
| Begins practicing zazen meditation.
|-
| 1612
| 28
| Duel with Sasaki Kojirō takes place on April 13, on Ganryujima (Ganryu or Funa Island) off the coast of Shimonoseki in which Kojiro is defeated.
|-
|
|
| Briefly opens a fencing school.
|-
| 1614–1615
| 30–31
| Believed to have joined the troops of Toyotomi Hideyori in the Winter and Summer campaigns (November 8, 1614 – June 15, 1615) at Osaka Castle, but no significant contributions are documented.
|-
| 1615–1621
| 30–37
| Comes into the service of Ogasawara Tadanao in Harima Province as a construction supervisor.
|-
| 1621
| 36–37
| Duels Miyake Gunbei in Tatsuno, Hyōgo.
|-
| 1622
| 37–38
| Sets up temporary residence at the castle town of Himeji, Hyōgo.
|-
| 1623
| 38–39
| Travels to Edo.
|-
|
|
| Adopts a son named Iori.
|-
| 1626
| 41–42
| Adopted son Mikinosuke commits seppuku following in the tradition of Junshi.
|-
| 1627
| 42–43
| Travels again.
|-
| 1628
| 43–44
| Meets with Yagyū Hyōgonosuke in Nagoya, Owari Province.
|-
| 1630
| 45–46
| Enters the service of Lord Hosokawa Tadatoshi.
|-
| 1633
| 48–49
| Begins to extensively practice the arts.
|-
| 1634
| 49–50
| Settles in Kokura, Fukuoka Prefecture for a short time with son Iori as a guest of Ogasawara Tadazane.
|-
| 1637–1638
| 53–54
| Serves a major role in the Shimabara Rebellion (December 17, 1637 – April 15, 1638) and is the only documented evidence that Musashi served in battle. Was knocked off his horse by a rock thrown by one of the peasants.
|-
| 1641
| 56–57
| Writes Hyoho Sanju-go.
|-
| 1642
| 57–58
| Suffers severe attacks from neuralgia.
|-
| 1643
| 58–59
| Migrates into Reigandō where he lives as a hermit.
|-
| 1645
| 61
| Finishes [[The Book of Five Rings|Go Rin No Sho/The Book of Five Rings]]. Dies from what is believed to be lung cancer.
 
|}

Philosophy

In Musashi's last book, Musashi seems to take a very philosophical approach to looking at the "craft of war": "There are five ways in which men pass through life: as gentlemen, warriors, farmers, artisans and merchants."

Throughout the book, Musashi implies that the way of the Warrior, as well as the meaning of a "true strategist" is that of somebody who has made mastery of many art forms away from that of the sword, such as tea drinking (sadō), laboring, writing, and painting, as Musashi practiced throughout his life. Musashi was hailed as an extraordinary sumi-e artist in the use of ink monochrome as depicted in two such paintings: "Shrike Perched in a Dead Tree" (Koboku Meigekizu, 枯木鳴鵙図) and "Wild Geese Among Reeds" (Rozanzu, 魯山図). Going back to the Book of Five Rings, Musashi talks deeply about the ways of Buddhism.

He makes particular note of artisans and foremen. When he wrote the book, the majority of houses in Japan were made of wood. In the use of building a house, foremen have to employ strategy based upon the skill and ability of their workers.

In comparison to warriors and soldiers, Musashi notes the ways in which the artisans thrive through events; the ruin of houses, the splendor of houses, the style of the house, the tradition and name or origins of a house. These too, are similar to the events which are seen to have warriors and soldiers thrive; the rise and fall of prefectures, countries and other such events are what make uses for warriors, as well as the literal comparisons: "The carpenter uses a master plan of the building, and the way of strategy is similar in that there is a plan of campaign".

Way of strategy

Ni-Ten Ichi Ryu

Within the book, Musashi mentions that the use of two swords within strategy is equally beneficial to those who use the skill for individual duels or large engagements. The idea of using two hands for a sword is an idea that Musashi opposes because there is no fluidity in movement with two hands: "If you hold a sword with both hands, it is difficult to wield it freely to left and right, so my method is to carry the sword in one hand." He also disagrees with the idea of using a sword with two hands on a horse and/or riding on unstable terrain, such as muddy swamps, rice fields, or within crowds of people.

To learn the strategy of Ni-Ten Ichi Ryū, Musashi employs that by training with two long swords, one in each hand, one will be able to overcome the cumbersome nature of using a sword in both hands. Although it is difficult, Musashi agrees that there are times in which the long sword must be used with two hands, but one whose skill is good enough should not need it.

After using two long swords proficiently enough, mastery of a long sword, and a "companion sword", most likely a wakizashi, will be much increased: "When you become used to wielding the long sword, you will gain the power of the Way and wield the sword well."

In short, it could be seen, from the excerpts from The Book of Five Rings, that real strategy behind Ni-Ten No Ichi Ryu, is that there is no real iron-clad method, path, or type of weaponry specific to the style of Ni-Ten No Ichi Ryu:

Religion
Even from an early age, Musashi separated his religion from his involvement in swordsmanship. Excerpts such as the one below, from The Book of Five Rings, demonstrate a philosophy that is thought to have stayed with him throughout his life:

However, the belief that Musashi disliked Shinto is inaccurate, as he criticises the Shintō-ryū style of swordsmanship, not Shinto, the religion. In Musashi's Dokkōdō, his stance on religion is further elucidated: "Respect Buddha and the gods without counting on their help."

As an artist

In his later years, Musashi said in his The Book of Five Rings: "When I apply the principle of strategy to the ways of different arts and crafts, I no longer have need for a teacher in any domain." He proved this by creating recognized masterpieces of calligraphy and classic ink painting. His paintings are characterized by skilled use of ink washes and an economy of brush stroke. He especially mastered the "broken ink" school of landscapes, applying it to other subjects, such as his Kobokumeikakuzu ("Shrike Perched on a Withered Branch"; part of a triptych whose other two members were "Hotei Walking" and "Sparrow on Bamboo"), his Hotei Watching a Cockfight, and his Rozanzu ("Wild Geese Among Reeds"). The Book of Five Rings advocates involvement in calligraphy and other arts as a means of training in the art of war.

In Japanese and global culture

Miyamoto Musashi Budokan

On 20 May 2000, at the initiative of Sensei Tadashi Chihara the Miyamoto Musashi Budokan was inaugurated. It was built in Ōhara-Cho in the province of Mimasaka, the birthplace of the samurai. Inside the building, the life and journey of Miyamoto Musashi are remembered everywhere. Dedicated to martial arts, the Budokan is the source for all of Japan's official traditional saber and kendo schools. Practically, historically and culturally it is a junction for martial disciplines in the heart of traditional Japan dedicated to Musashi.

The inauguration of the Miyamoto Musashi Budokan perpetuated the twinning established on March 4, 1999, between the inhabitants of Ōhara-Chō (Japanese province of Mimasaka) and the inhabitants of Gleizé. It was formalized in the presence of Sensei Tadashi Chihara, guarantor and tenth in the lineage of Miyamoto Musashi carrying a mandate from the mayor of Ōhara-Chō, and in the presence of the mayor of Gleizé Élisabeth Lamure. This event was extended during the mandate of the new mayor of Ōhara-Chō Fukuda Yoshiaki, by the official invitation from Japan and the consequent visit of the mayor of Gleizé for the inauguration of the Miyamoto Musashi Budokan on 10 May 2000, in the presence of personalities and Japanese authorities.

In popular culture

Even in Musashi's time there were fictional texts resembling comic books. It is therefore quite difficult to separate fact from fiction when discussing his life. There have been numerous works of fiction made about or featuring Musashi. Eiji Yoshikawa's novelization (originally a 1930s daily newspaper serial) has greatly influenced successive fictional depictions (including the manga Vagabond by Takehiko Inoue) and is often mistaken for a factual account of Musashi's life. In 2012, writer Sean Michael Wilson and Japanese artist Chie Kutsuwada published an attempt at a more historically accurate manga entitled The Book of Five Rings: A Graphic Novel, based on research and translations by William Scott Wilson.

The 2008 video game Ryū ga Gotoku Kenzan! was based on his life and personality.

He also appeared in the manga Baki-Dou as a revived clone of himself with his real soul intact as one of the strongest fighters in the series, and used his two-sword style in almost every combat in which he was shown.

In the video game Overwatch the playable character Genji has a voice line that quotes Musashi: "Mi wo sutetemo myōri wa sutezu" (身を捨てても名利は捨てず), which roughly translates to "You may abandon your body, but you must preserve your honor."

The card game Magic: The Gathering has a card based on him, Isshin, Two Heavens as One, named for his two swords as one technique.

In Cyberpunk 2077 the character Takemura sends a text message to V that reads "Even should you abandon your body, never abandon your honor. Never stray from the Way. Miyamoto Musashi" This text can only be received after the mission Search and Destroy, if the player saves Takemura.

 Gallery 

BibliographyHyodokyo (The Mirror of the Way of Strategy)Hyoho Sanjugo Kajo (Thirty-five Instructions on Strategy)Hyoho Shijuni Kajo (Forty-two Instructions on Strategy)Dokkōdō (The Way to be Followed Alone)Go Rin No Sho (The Book of Five Rings; a reference to the Five Rings of Zen Buddhism). Translated into English by Victor Harris as A Book of Five Rings, London: Allison & Busby, 1974; Woodstock, New York: The Overlook Press.

See also

 Yagyū Munenori
 Gosho Motoharu
 Hōjō Akinokami
 Sasaki Kojiro
 Takuan Soho
 Terao Magonojō
 Eiji Yoshikawa
 Bizen
 Mimasaka
 Ōhara-chō
 Miyamoto Musashi Budokan
 Miyamoto Musashi Station
 Philosophy of war
 List of military writers

References

Further reading

Fiction
  (Manga/historical fiction)
  (Manga/historical fiction)
  (Manga/historical fiction)
  (Historical fiction)

Children's books
 

Essays
 
 
 
 
 
 
 

Testimony
 Iwami Toshio Harukatsu soke (11th successor to Miyamoto Musashi), Musashi's teachings – philosophy first: translation in English, Dragon n°7, January 2005, ed. Mathis ; French original text: L'enseignement de Musashi est d'abord une philosophie
 Iwami Toshio Harukatsu soke (11th successor to Miyamoto Musashi), Musashi's principles, Dragon'' n°13, January 2006, ed. Mathis; French original text: Les principes de Musashi

External links

 miyamotomusashi.eu
 Miyamoto Musashi Dojo 
 Some artwork by Miyamoto Musashi (archive link)
 The samurai warrior and Zen Buddhism (website of the Asian Art Museum, San Francisco)
Complete texts in English by Miyamoto Musashi
Miyamoto Musashi; his Swordsmanship and Book of Five Rings
Profile on Shambhala Publications website

 
1580s births
1584 births
1645 deaths
17th-century Japanese calligraphers
17th-century philosophers
Artist authors
Japanese Buddhists
Japanese duelists
Japanese non-fiction writers
Japanese painters
Japanese philosophers
Japanese swordfighters
Kendo
Martial arts school founders
Martial arts writers
Samurai